Palarini is a tribe of square-headed wasps in the family Crabronidae. There are at least 2 genera and more than 30 described species in Palarini.

Genera
These two genera belong to the tribe Palarini:
 Mesopalarus Brauns, 1899
 Palarus Latreille, 1802

References

Crabronidae